This article contains information about the literary events and publications of 1552.

Events
June – Sir David Lyndsay's Middle Scots satirical morality play A Satire of the Three Estates first performed publicly in full, at Cupar in Fife.
unknown dates
Giachem Bifrun produces the first printed book in the Swiss Romansh language (Putèr), Christiauna fuorma, a catechism.
Belgrade printing house is established.
Ralph Roister Doister, the first known comedy in the English, is written by London schoolmaster Nicholas Udall for his pupils to perform.

New books

Prose
Book of Common Prayer (revised)
Bartolomé de las Casas – A Short Account of the Destruction of the Indies (Brevísima relación de la destrucción de las Indias) (written 1542)
François Rabelais – Le Quart Livre
Gerónimo de Santa Fe (posthumously) – Hebræomastix
Libellus de Medicinalibus Indorum Herbis (Little Book of the Medicinal Herbs of the Indians), composed in Nahuatl by Martín de la Cruz and translated into Latin by Juan Badiano.

Drama
David Lyndsay – A Satire of the Three Estates (first public performance)
Hans Sachs – Der Bauer im Fegefeuer

Poetry
See 1552 in poetry

Births
February 8 – Agrippa d'Aubigné, French Protestant poet (died 1630)
unknown dates
Jean Bertaut, French poet (died 1611)
Philemon Holland, English translator and schoolmaster (died 1637)
Edmund Spenser, English poet (died 1599)
probable – Cvijeta Zuzorić, Croatian poet (died 1648)

Deaths
June 10 – Alexander Barclay, probably Scottish-born English writer, cleric and translator (born c. 1476)
October 17 – Andreas Osiander, German theologian (born 1498)
December 11 – Paolo Giovio, Italian historian and biographer (born 1483)
December 30 – Francisco de Enzinas, Spanish-born Netherlandish scholar and humanist (born c. 1518)

References

Years of the 16th century in literature